Battle Cry is the debut album by American heavy metal band Omen. It was originally released in 1984 by Metal Blade.
In 2005, Metal Blade re-released Battle Cry on Picture LP format, limited to 500 copies and including two bonus tracks. In 2019, Metal Hammer ranked it as the 16th best power metal album of all time.

Track listing

Personnel
Omen
 J.D. Kimball - vocals
 Kenny Powell - guitars, backing vocals
 Jody Henry - bass, backing vocals
 Steve Wittig - drums

Production
 Brian Slagel – production
 Ron Fair – engineering, mixing
 Bill Metoyer – engineering
 Scott Singer – engineering
 Carolyn Collins – assistant engineering
 Vince Gutierrez – cover art

References

Omen (band) albums
1984 debut albums
Metal Blade Records albums